Air Marshal Dame Susan Catherine Gray,  ( Jessop; born 21 October 1963) is a former senior Royal Air Force officer. She served as Director of Combat Air at Defence Equipment and Support in the Ministry of Defence (2014–16), as Air Officer Commanding No. 38 Group (2016–18), and as Director-General of the Defence Safety Authority (2019–22). She is the most senior female officer ever to serve in the British Armed Forces.

Early life and education
Gray was born on 21 October 1963. She studied electronics at Newcastle Polytechnic (now the Northumbria University), graduating with a Bachelor of Science degree.

Military career
Gray joined the Engineer Branch of the Women's Royal Air Force (WRAF) in 1985. She was promoted to flying officer on 18 February 1986, and to flight lieutenant on 18 February 1989. In 1991, she was deployed with the Support Helicopter Force to Iraq as part of the Gulf War. On 15 June 1992, she moved from a Short Service Commission to a Permanent Commission, and therefore extended her service time to retirement age.

In 1994, the Women's Royal Air Force merged into the previously all-male Royal Air Force (RAF). Since then, Gray has served in the RAF. On 1 July 1994, as part of the half-yearly promotions, she was promoted to squadron leader. On 1 January 2001, as part of the half-yearly promotions, she was promoted to wing commander. In 2003, she was once more deployed to Iraq, this time as part of Operation Telic (the Iraq War) and served as Chief Engineer for the Joint Helicopter Force.

Air officer
Gray was appointed Officer of the Order of the British Empire (OBE) in the 2005 New Year Honours and, on 1 January as part of the half-yearly promotions, she was promoted to air commodore.

On 29 January 2014, Gray was promoted to air vice-marshal and appointed Director of Combat Air at Defence Equipment and Support in the Ministry of Defence. 

In that role she was "responsible for the procurement and maintenance of all combat aircraft, training aircraft and remotely-piloted air systems for the armed forces". She is the second female officer to be promoted to non-honorary two-star rank (major general in the British Army, rear admiral in the Royal Navy or air vice marshal in the Royal Air Force) in the British Armed Forces since the Second World War; the first was Elaine West who had been promoted to air vice-marshal in August 2013. In February 2016, it was announced that she would be the next Air Officer Commanding No. 38 Group. She took up the appointment on 16 June 2016 in succession to Tim Bishop. 

Gray was appointed Companion of the Order of the Bath (CB) in the 2017 New Year Honours, and was elected a Fellow of the Royal Academy of Engineering. She handed over command of No. 38 Group to Air Commodore Simon Ellard in December 2018.

On 20 February 2019, it was announced that Gray had been promoted to air marshal, and thus becomes Britain's first ever female three-star officer: she thereby became the most senior female officer in the British Armed Forces. 

Between March 2019, and January 2022, she was the Director General of the Defence Safety Authority. 

She was appointed Dame Commander of the Order of the British Empire (DBE) in the 2022 New Year Honours. Gray retired in May 2022.

Gray is a recipient of three campaign medals; the General Service Medal, the Gulf Medal, and the Iraq Medal. She is also a recipient of the Queen Elizabeth II Golden Jubilee Medal and the Queen Elizabeth II Diamond Jubilee Medal.

References

 

|-

1960s births
21st-century women engineers
Alumni of Northumbria University
British women engineers
Dames Commander of the Order of the British Empire
Companions of the Order of the Bath
Female air marshals of the Royal Air Force
Fellows of the Royal Academy of Engineering
Female Fellows of the Royal Academy of Engineering
Living people
Royal Air Force air marshals
Royal Air Force personnel of the Gulf War
Royal Air Force personnel of the Iraq War
Women's Royal Air Force officers